Events from the year 1992 in Sweden

Incumbents
 Monarch – Carl XVI Gustaf
 Prime Minister – Carl Bildt

Events

 The French School in Gothenburg was founded in Gothenburg.

Popular culture

Film
 26 September – Lotta på Bråkmakargatan was released in Sweden. The film was based on books by Astrid Lindgren, and was directed by Johanna Hald.

Births
 14 April – Oliver Bohm, ice hockey player
 18 May – John Persson, ice hockey player
July 3 – Molly Sandén, Swedish singer.

Deaths

 28 January – Arvid Andersson-Holtman, gymnast (born 1896).
 3 February – Knut Fridell, wrestler (born 1908).
 2 April – Hjalmar Karlsson, sailor (born 1906).
 30 July – Bo Lindman, modern pentathlete (born 1899).

See also
 1992 in Swedish television

References

 
Sweden
Years of the 20th century in Sweden